The Better Way is a 1926 American silent film directed by and starring Ralph Ince.

Cast
 Dorothy Revier as Betty Boyd  
 Ralph Ince as Billie  
 Eugene Strong 
 Armand Kaliz 
 Hazel Howell

References

Bibliography
 Quinlan, David. The Illustrated Guide to Film Directors. Batsford, 1983.

External links

1926 films
Films directed by Ralph Ince
American silent feature films
1920s English-language films
American black-and-white films
Columbia Pictures films
1920s American films